Nélson "Nelsinho" Baptista Júnior (born July 22, 1950) is a Brazilian retired footballer who played as a right back, and manager who currently works as the manager of Japanese club Kashiwa Reysol.

Playing career
Born in Campinas, São Paulo state, he started his career in 1967, playing for Ponte Preta, but the best moment in his career was playing for São Paulo, where he won the 1975 Campeonato Paulista, and played 262 matches, having scored six goals. He has also played for Santos, where he won the 1978 Campeonato Paulista, and Juventus.

Managerial career
As a manager, he has coached several clubs, like the Brazilian clubs São Bento, Ponte Preta, Internacional (SP), Atlético Paranaense, América-SP, Novorizontino, Corinthians, Guarani, Palmeiras, Internacional, Cruzeiro, São Paulo, Portuguesa, Goiás and Flamengo. In 2005, Nelsinho Baptista was not very successful managing Santos, leaving the club after a 7–1 defeat to Corinthians at Estádio do Pacaembu, and a 4–0 defeat to Internacional at Estádio Anacleto Campanella. In 2006, he managed São Caetano. In 2007, he managed Ponte Preta again, and was Corinthians' manager when the club was relegated to Campeonato Brasileiro Série B, and from December 2007 to 2009, he was Sport Recife's manager, where he won the 2008 Campeonato Pernambucano and the 2008 Copa do Brasil.

He managed several non-Brazilian clubs like Sporting Barranquilla of Colombia in 1989, Al-Hilal of Saudi Arabia in 1993 and in 1994, Verdy Kawasaki of Japan from 1994 to 1996, Colo-Colo of Chile in 1999, and Nagoya Grampus Eight of Japan from 2003 to 2005. On May 28, 2009 Sport Club do Recife coach Batista has resigned most likely due to some personal problems with the team's most influential players.

In July 2009, Nelsinho returned to Japan to manage Kashiwa Reysol. Despite being unable to stave off relegation to J2 League at the end of the year, the club relented and allowed him to remain in charge. In 2011, Reysol under him won their first ever J1 League title, making history by becoming the first team to win the championship following promotion. In the same year, Nelsinho Baptista received the J. League Manager of the Year at the J. League awards in Yokohama.

Personal life

He is the father of also manager Eduardo Baptista.

Managerial statistics
Update; March 12, 2023

Honours

Manager
Kashiwa Reysol
 J.League Division 1: 2011
 J.League Division 2: 2010, 2019
 J.League Cup: 2013
 Emperor's Cup: 2012
 Japanese Super Cup: 2012
 Suruga Bank Championship: 2014

São Paulo
 Campeonato Paulista: 1998

Corinthians
 Campeonato Brasileiro: 1990
 Supercopa do Brasil: 1991
 Campeonato Paulista: 1997

Athletico Paranaense
 Campeonato Paranaense: 1988

Individual
 J.League Manager of the Year: 2011

References

External links
 
 

1950 births
Living people
Sportspeople from Campinas
Association football fullbacks
Brazilian footballers
Campeonato Brasileiro Série A players
Brazilian football managers
Campeonato Brasileiro Série A managers
J1 League managers
J2 League managers
Expatriate football managers in Chile
Expatriate football managers in Japan
Expatriate football managers in Saudi Arabia
Associação Atlética Ponte Preta players
São Paulo FC players
Santos FC players
Clube Atlético Juventus players
Esporte Clube São Bento managers
Associação Atlética Ponte Preta managers
Associação Atlética Internacional (Limeira) managers
Club Athletico Paranaense managers
América Futebol Clube (SP) managers
Sport Club Corinthians Paulista managers
Guarani FC managers
Sociedade Esportiva Palmeiras managers
Al Hilal SFC managers
Tokyo Verdy managers
Sport Club Internacional managers
Cruzeiro Esporte Clube managers
São Paulo FC managers
Colo-Colo managers
Associação Portuguesa de Desportos managers
Goiás Esporte Clube managers
CR Flamengo managers
Associação Desportiva São Caetano managers
Nagoya Grampus managers
Santos FC managers
Sport Club do Recife managers
Kashiwa Reysol managers
Vissel Kobe managers
Brazilian expatriate football managers
Brazilian expatriate sportspeople in Japan
Brazilian expatriate sportspeople in Saudi Arabia
Brazilian expatriate sportspeople in Chile
Brazilian expatriate sportspeople in Colombia
Expatriate football managers in Colombia